Caviria is a genus of moths in the subfamily Lymantriinae described by Jacob Hübner in 1819. The species are widespread throughout South America, north east India, Sri Lanka, Myanmar, the Andaman Islands, and Java.

Description
Palpi minute and porrect (projecting forward). Antennae bipectinated where the branches are longer in males and short in females. Hind tibia has one pair of spurs. Forewings with vein 3 from before angle of cell. Veins 4 and 5 from angle. Vein 6 from upper angle. Veins 7, 8 and 9 are stalked. Hindwings with vein 3 from before angle of cell. Veins 4 and 5 from angle and veins 6 and 7 from upper angle.

Species
Caviria andeola
Caviria athana
Caviria comes
Caviria doda
Caviria eutelida
Caviria hedda
Caviria marcellina
Caviria micans
Caviria odriana
Caviria regina
Caviria sericea
Caviria vestalis
Caviria vinasia

References

 

Lymantriini